Sibiryak is the name of several rural localities in Russia:
Sibiryak, Irkutsk Oblast, a settlement in Tulunsky District of Irkutsk Oblast
Sibiryak, Krasnoyarsk Krai, a settlement in Uspensky Selsoviet of Rybinsky District of Krasnoyarsk Krai
Sibiryak, Bolotninsky District, Novosibirsk Oblast, a settlement in Bolotninsky District, Novosibirsk Oblast
Sibiryak, Cherepanovsky District, Novosibirsk Oblast, a settlement in Cherepanovsky District, Novosibirsk Oblast
Sibiryak, Tatarsky District, Novosibirsk Oblast, a settlement in Tatarsky District, Novosibirsk Oblast
Sibiryak, Tyumen Oblast, a settlement in Priirtyshsky Rural Okrug of Tobolsky District of Tyumen Oblast